Gaston Gerville-Réache (born 23 August 1854 in Pointe-a-Pitre, Guadeloupe; died 30 May 1908 in Mareil-en-France, France) was a politician from Guadeloupe who served in the French National Assembly from 1881-1906 .
His daughter was Opera Singer Jeanne Gerville Reache Rambaud.

References
Gaston Gerville-Réache page on the French National Assembly website

1854 births
1908 deaths
People from Pointe-à-Pitre
Guadeloupean politicians
French republicans
Members of the 3rd Chamber of Deputies of the French Third Republic
Members of the 4th Chamber of Deputies of the French Third Republic
Members of the 5th Chamber of Deputies of the French Third Republic
Members of the 6th Chamber of Deputies of the French Third Republic
Members of the 7th Chamber of Deputies of the French Third Republic
Members of the 8th Chamber of Deputies of the French Third Republic